The list of Grand Valley State University people includes notable alumni, faculty, staff, and presidents. There are over 120,000 alumni who reside in all 50 U.S. states, Canada and other countries.

Presidents of Grand Valley State University
Past and current presidents include:
James Zumberge
Arend Lubbers
Mark Murray
Thomas J. Haas
Philomena Mantella

Alumni
Howard Bailey - former Detroit Tigers pitcher
Brandon Barnes - former offensive lineman for the NFL Indianapolis Colts
John Beyrle - United States Ambassador to the Russian Federation
Josh Bourke - tackle for the CFL Montreal Alouettes
Cameron Bradfield - offensive tackle for Jacksonville Jaguars
Greg Cadaret - former Major League Baseball pitcher
Brian Calley - Michigan House of Representatives, banker, Republican politician, Lieutenant Governor of Michigan
Brandon Carr - cornerback for the Dallas Cowboys
Jeff Chadwick - former NFL wide receiver
The Crane Wives - all five band members (Ben Zito, Dan Rickabus, Kate Pillsbury, Emilee Petersmark, and Tom Gunnels)
Paul Cranmer - former CFL player
Steven Rinella - American outdoorsman, conservationist, writer, and television personality known for translating the hunting and fishing lifestyle to a wide variety of audiences.
Mark Dewey - former Major League Baseball pitcher
Patrick Sheane Duncan - screenwriter, director (Mr. Holland's Opus, Courage Under Fire)
Darnell Earley - former interim mayor of Flint, Michigan; city manager of Saginaw, Michigan
Ron Essink - former NFL offensive tackle of the Seattle Seahawks
Tony Ferguson - two-time Collegiate All-American wrestler; professional mixed martial artist; winner of season 13 of The Ultimate Fighter; former UFC Lightweight Interim Champion
Cullen Finnerty - former NFL quarterback
Frank Foster - member of the Michigan House of Representatives serving the 107th District
Eric Fowler - former NFL wide receiver
Robert Genetski - member of the Michigan House of Representatives serving the 88th District
Mike Gravier - NCAA football coach
Thomas Hooker - member of the Michigan House of Representatives serving the 77th District
Charles Johnson - NFL wide receiver for the Minnesota Vikings
Derrick Jones - former NFL defensive tackle/end of the Tennessee Titans
Margo F. Jonker - assistant softball coach for the United States at the 2000 Summer Olympics in Sydney Australia; head softball coach of the Central Michigan Chippewas
Matthew Judon - NFL linebacker for the Baltimore Ravens and New England Patriots
John Keating - Fox Sports Net personality who used the on-air name "Steve Knight" in Grand Rapids
David Kircus - former NFL wide receiver for the Denver Broncos
Kevin Lee - professional MMA fighter, current UFC Lightweight contender
Tim Lelito - NFL offensive lineman for the New Orleans Saints
Keyonta Marshall - former NFL defensive tackle for the New York Jets
Nick McDonald - NFL free agent offensive lineman
Rick Outman - member of the Michigan House of Representatives serving the 70th District
Kasey Peters - football player
Tommy Remengesau - President of the Republic of Palau
Rob Rubick - former NFL tight end of the Detroit Lions
Michael Sak - former member of the Michigan House of Representatives
Virgil L. Sharpton - administrator at University of Alaska Fairbanks and member of the US Arctic Research Commission
Bill Sheridan - linebackers coach for the Miami Dolphins
Glenn Duffie Shriver
Dan Skuta - NFL linebacker who plays for the Jacksonville Jaguars
 Wm. Stage - journalist and photographer
 Cody Stamann - professional Mixed Martial Artist currently in the UFC's Bantamweight Division
Jon Switalski - member of the Michigan House of Representatives serving the 25th District; former Macomb County Commissioner
Matt Thornton - pitcher for the Chicago White Sox
Erion Veliaj - Ex Minister of Youth and Social Affairs of Albania, Mayor of Tirana; AB Political Science
Dave Whinham - football coach
Sarah Zelenka - rower at the 2012 Summer Olympics

Faculty and staff
Tom Beck - football head coach, 1985–1990
Mary de Young - sociology professor and author
Don Dufek Sr. - athletic director, 1972–1976
Brady Hoke - defensive line coach, 1983; Michigan Wolverines head football coach
Brian Kelly - football head coach, 1991–2003; Notre Dame and LSU head football coach
Helen Marlais - pianist, piano performance and pedagogy professor
Chuck Martin - football head coach, 2005–2009; Notre Dame assistant coach and 2010–2013; Miami (Ohio) head football coach
Monica McFawn Robinson - winner of the 2013 Flannery O'Connor Award for Short Fiction
David Plowden - photographer and lecturer
Jay Smith - basketball head coach, 1996-97
Margaret Sellers Walker - professor of public administration, 1993–2002, and associate director of the Dorothy A. Johnson Center for Philanthropy and Nonprofit Leadership
Gleaves Whitney - author and director of the Hauenstein Center for Presidential Studies

References

External links
Grand Valley State University Alumni Relations

Grand Valley State University